Guancheng Hui District is one of 6 urban districts of the prefecture-level city of Zhengzhou, the capital of Henan Province, China.

The District government is located in this district. The ruins of a Shang Dynasty city,  are located here in Shang City Park.

History 

The ancient Shang Dynasty city of  existed within the location of the present-day Guancheng Hui District. Dating back to sometime between 1600 BCE and 1100 BCE, the location of Ao's ruins now lie within Shang City Park.

The city of Zhengzhou was captured by the People's Liberation Army in 1948.

In 1958, Guancheng Hui District was established after the merger of Longhai District and Jinshui Hui District.

In May 1966, Guancheng Hui District was re-designated as Xiangyang District. Along with the district's name change, various subdistricts within it were renamed.

In November 1981, it was re-designated as Xiangyang Hui District.

In 1983, the district returned to its original name, Guancheng Hui District, which it remains named as today. Various subdistricts within the district which were renamed during the Cultural Revolution reverted to their original names.

Geography 

Administrative divisions
The Guancheng Hui District administers 13 subdistricts, and 1 township. The district government is located within the Beixia Street Subdistrict.

Subdistricts 
The following 13 subdistricts are located within the district:

Township 

Demographics 
The district has a sizable Hui population, which totals about 23,000 people.

Cultural Sites 
The district is home to a number of cultural sites, many of which date back hundreds of years. The famous Zhengzhou Shang City ruins, which possibly date back to sometime between 1600 BCE and 1100 BCE, lie within the district. The Beidajie Mosque, which possibly dates back to the Ming Dynasty, and continues to serve as a cultural center for the city's Muslim population, is located within the Beixia Street Subdistrict. The mosque is both the oldest and largest in Zhengzhou. The , which dates back to the Ming Dynasty, also lies within the district.

A number of historically significant streets, such as Guancheng Street, and Shuyuan Street, lie within the district.

The Zhongyuan Tower, a 388 meter tall steel skyscraper, is also located within the district.

Economy

Yutong has its headquarters in the Yutong Industrial Park in the district.

Guancheng Hui District is home to a sizable gold and jewelry industry, which accounts for transactions worth ¥20 billion annually. This comprises over 60% of the total industry in Zhengzhou.

Transportation 

National Highway 107 and National Highway 310 both pass through Guancheng Hui District.

The Longhai Railway and the Beijing–Guangzhou railway both pass through the district. The Zhengzhou East railway station is located in the district.

References

External links
 Official website of Guancheng Hui District government

Districts of Zhengzhou
Hui people